Karel Zvonař (25 October 1912 – February 1994) was a Czech wrestler. He competed in the men's Greco-Roman welterweight at the 1936 Summer Olympics.

References

External links
 

1912 births
Year of death missing
Czech male sport wrestlers
Olympic wrestlers of Czechoslovakia
Wrestlers at the 1936 Summer Olympics
Place of birth missing